The jabiru ( or ; Jabiru mycteria) is a large stork found in the Americas from Mexico to Argentina, except west of the Andes. It sometimes wanders into the United States, usually in Texas, but has been reported as far north as Mississippi.  It is most common in the Pantanal region of Brazil and the Eastern Chaco region of Paraguay.  It is the only member of the genus Jabiru.  The name comes from a Tupi–Guaraní language and means "swollen neck".

Taxonomy
Hinrich Lichtenstein described the jabiru in 1819. The name jabiru has also been used for two other birds of a distinct genus: black-necked stork (Ephippiorhynchus asiaticus), commonly called "jabiru" in Australia; and sometimes also for the saddle-billed stork (Ephippiorhynchus senegalensis) of Sub-Saharan Africa. In particular, Gardiner's Egyptian hieroglyph G29, believed to depict an E. senegalensis, is sometimes labeled "jabiru" in hieroglyph lists. The Ephippiorhynchus are believed to be the jabiru's closest living cousins, indicating an Old World origin for the species.

The proposed Late Pleistocene fossil stork genus Prociconia from Brazil might actually belong in Jabiru. A fossil species of jabiru was found in the early Pliocene Codore Formation near Urumaco, Venezuela, and named Jabiru codorensis.

In Portuguese, the bird is called tuiuiu, tuim-de-papo-vermelho ("red-necked tuim", in Mato Grosso) and cauauá (in the Amazon Basin).  The name jabiru is used for the wood stork (Mycteria americana).

Description
The jabiru is the tallest flying bird found in South America and Central America, often standing nearly the same height as the flightless and thus much heavier greater rhea. For the continent, it also has the second largest wingspan, after the Andean condor (that is, excluding the great albatross occasionally found off the coast of southern South America). Sexual dimorphism is high, possibly the highest of any stork, with males being about 25% larger than females. The beak, which measures , is black and broad, slightly upturned, ending in a sharp point. The plumage is mostly white, but the head and upper neck are featherless and black, with a featherless red stretchable pouch at the base. The sexes are similar in appearance but the male is larger, which can be noticeable when the sexes are together. While it can give the impression of being an ungainly bird on the ground, the jabiru is a powerful and graceful flier.

Life history

Food and feeding habits
The jabiru lives in large groups near rivers and ponds, and eats prodigious quantities of frogs, fish, snakes, snails, insects, and other invertebrates. It will even eat fresh carrion and dead fish, such as those that die during dry spells, and thus help maintain the quality of isolated bodies of water. They feed in flocks and usually forage by wading in shallow water. Jabirus detect prey more through tactile sensation than vision. They feed by holding their open bill at a 45 degree angle to the water. When prey is contacted, the storks close their bill, draw it out of the water, and throw their head back to swallow. It is an opportunistic feeder. In one instance when house mice experienced a population explosion in an agricultural area, several hundred jabirus could be seen in each field feeding on the rodents (unusual for a bird that's rarely seen in large numbers anywhere). On rare occasions, jabirus have been seen attempting to kleptoparasitize the two smaller storks it co-exists with, the wood and maguari storks.

Breeding

Jabirus are solitary nesters, building massive nest platforms that are used repeatedly in successive seasons. Unlike many other storks, these species are often seen in pairs in the nonbreeding season suggesting a lifelong pair bond. The nest of sticks is built by both parents around August–September (in the Southern Hemisphere) on tall trees, and enlarged at each succeeding season growing to several meters in diameter. Half a dozen nests may be built in close proximity, sometimes among nests of herons and other birds. The parents take turns incubating the clutch of two to five white eggs and are known to more territorial than usual against other jabirus during the brooding period. Raccoons and other storks (including their own species) are occasion predators of jabiru eggs, but most nest predators appear to avoid these huge-billed birds and there are no known predators of healthy adult jabirus. Although the young fledge around 110 days old, they often spend around another 3 months in the care of their parents. Because of this long length of time spent brooding, pairs have difficulty breeding in successive years. Less than half of active pairs in one season are active the next season. Only 25% of successful pairs are successful the next season. The lifespan average is 36 years. The Jabiru has a diploid number of 2n = 56.

Conservation
Jabiru are widespread but not abundant in any area. They are considered a species of least concern by the IUCN, an improvement from a status of near threatened in 1988. Jabiru gained protected status in Belize in 1973. Since then, their numbers in that area have slowly risen. They have been granted protected status by the U.S. Migratory Bird Act.

Gallery

References

External links

Jabiru Video Documentary

 Saúde Animal: Jaburu ou tuiuiú: Espécie animal brasileiro ameaçado de extinção [in Portuguese]. Retrieved 6 December 2006.
Stamps (for nine countries) with a range map
 
Photo-High Res; Article borderland-tours

Ciconiidae
Birds of Nicaragua
Birds of the Yucatán Peninsula
Birds of South America
Birds of Venezuela
Birds of the Guianas
Birds of the Pantanal
Birds of Paraguay
Birds of the Caribbean
Birds described in 1819